Peter Jude Zoccolillo (born February 6, 1977) is a former professional baseball outfielder. He played part of the 2003 season in Major League Baseball for the Milwaukee Brewers.

Career
He played college baseball at Rutgers University where he was three times All-Big East First Team. He graduated with a degree in communications and a minor in psychology. He was drafted by the Chicago Cubs in the 23rd round of the 1999 amateur draft. At the trade deadline in 2001, the Cubs traded him and Rubén Quevedo to the Brewers for David Weathers and a minor leaguer. 

Zoccolillo made his Major League debut on September 5, 2003 at Miller Park. He recorded his first Major League hit on September 9 against Tim Redding of the Houston Astros. Following the season, the Texas Rangers selected him from the Brewers in the minor league phase of the Rule 5 draft.

After spending the 2005 season in the minors with the St. Louis Cardinals, he signed a contract with the Colorado Rockies. After playing with Italy at the 2006 World Baseball Classic, however, he decided to retire from professional baseball.

Personal life
Zoccolillo's father, Al, coached the Iona Gaels baseball team. His mother, Terry, was a teacher. He met his wife, Denise, before his final year at Rutgers.

In 2011, he was living in Randolph, New Jersey, working as a salesman for Enzo Clinical Labs and coaching youth baseball. In 2021, he was living in Mount Olive, New Jersey and was hired to coach the baseball team at Mount Olive High School.

References

External links

1977 births
Living people
American people of Italian descent
Beloit Snappers players
Daytona Cubs players
Eugene Emeralds players
High Desert Mavericks players
Huntsville Stars players
Indianapolis Indians players
Lansing Lugnuts players
Major League Baseball outfielders
Memphis Redbirds players
Milwaukee Brewers players
Oklahoma RedHawks players
Rutgers Scarlet Knights baseball players
Sportspeople from the Bronx
Baseball players from New York City
Springfield Cardinals players
2006 World Baseball Classic players
White Plains High School alumni